Calliandra bella is a species of flowering plants of the genus Calliandra in family Fabaceae.

References

Germplasm Resources Information Network: Calliandra 

bella
Taxa named by George Bentham